Homer David Fieldhouse (June 10, 1928 – June 30, 2008) was an American landscape architect who is credited with designing and overseeing the creation of almost 60 golf courses across the Midwest. He was close friends with Alex Jordan, creator of the House on the Rock.

Youth
Homer was born in Dodgeville, Wisconsin to Claire J. Fieldhouse and Effie M. Fieldhouse (née Davies). Claire was in the nursery business and one of his clients was Frank Lloyd Wright's Taliesin Design Studio, located near Spring Green, Wisconsin. Homer spent a summer as a teenager working with his father at Taliesin. 
 
After graduating from Dodgeville (WI.) High School in 1946, Homer enlisted in the Marines. He was stationed at Cherry Point, North Carolina as a mechanic, primarily working on F4U Corsairs.

College
After his discharge from the Marines, Homer enrolled in the landscape architecture department at Iowa State College (now Iowa State University), in Ames, Iowa. After three years there, he transferred to the University of Southern California in Los Angeles to study under noted landscape architect, Garrett Eckbo. While in Southern California, he helped with landscaping homes for movie stars such as Greer Garson.

Career
In 1953, Homer moved to Madison, Wisconsin to open a nursery business with his father.  The father-son team worked together until Claire died in 1957. Throughout the mid- to late-1950s, Homer worked on landscaping projects for a variety of clients, often traveling to California during the winter months to work. Homer and Lynn Sulis married at the Frank Lloyd Wright-designed First Unitarian Society Meeting House on June 28, 1958.   
 
Homer started doing golf course work in the mid-1950s, with the bulk of his golf course work being done between 1961 and 1972. A partial list from this period includes:

Sun Prairie Golf Course, Sun Prairie, WI - Opened 1961
Pigeon Run/Berms at Sheboygan Town & Country Golf Club, Sheboygan, WI - Opened 1962
Braidwood Recreation Club (2nd 9), Braidwood, IL - 1965
Camelot Country Club, Lomira, WI - Opened 1966
Gibson Woods Golf Course, Monmouth, IL - Opened 1966
(course record held by 2004 British Open champion Todd Hamilton.)
Candywood Golf Club, Vienna, OH - 1966
Ponderosa Country Club, Warren, OH - 1966
Eagle Bluff Golf Club, Hurley, WI - Opened 1967
High Cliff Golf Course, - Sherwood, WI - Opened 1968
Valley High Golf Club, - Houston, MN - Built 1968
Coachman’s Golf Resort, Edgerton, WI - Built in 3 stages: 1968, 1970, & 1991
Westhaven Golf Club, Oshkosh, WI - Opened 1969
Sugar Hills Golf Club (2nd 9), Goodland, KS - 1969
Golden Sands Golf Community, Cecil, WI - Opened 1971
Lake Creek Country Club, Storm Lake, IA - Opened 1972
(Homer's "absolute favorite")
Hillcrest Golf & Country Club (2nd 9), Yankton, SD - Built 1972

In the mid- to late-1950s, Homer befriended Alex Jordan, creator of the House on the Rock.  Homer, Alex, friend Edgar Hellum, Homer's brother Roger and members of Roger's work crew traveled to New York in March 1964 to landscape the Wisconsin Pavilion exhibit at the 1964-65 New York World's Fair. Homer had been hired by Wisconsin's Lieutenant Governor, Jack Olson, to do the outdoor landscaping and to construct an indoor waterfall.

In 1967, Homer prepared a book, Recreation Land Development, for the State of Wisconsin Department of Resource Development.

In the 1980s, Homer was able to establish contact and exchange correspondence with possible relative
Admiral Sir John Fieldhouse (later Baron Fieldhouse).

Throughout his career, Homer was also known for his creative deck and patio designs.

Homer's last 18-hole golf course was Lake Breeze Golf Club in Winneconne, Wisconsin, which opened in 1991. Overall, Homer's last golf course project was CNC Links in Newton, Wisconsin, which opened in 2008.
 
With the help of his son, Architect's Assistant/Presentation Model Craftsman Erik Fieldhouse, Homer was able to stay active in the profession through his final years. He died at age 80 in Madison in 2008.

Selected golf course projects
 Camelot Country Club - Lomira, WI
 Coachman's Golf Resort - Edgerton WI
 Gibson Woods Golf Course - Monmouth, IL
 High Cliff Golf Course - Sherwood, WI
 Idlewild Golf Course - Sturgeon Bay, WI
 Lake Breeze Golf Club - Winneconne, WI
 Lake Creek Country Club - Storm Lake, IA
 Rock River Hills Golf Club (1st 9) - Horicon, WI
 Valley High Country Club - Houston, MN
 Westhaven Golf Club - Oshkosh, WI

Expert witness
 "Tripoli Golf Club" vs Milwaukee County Highway Commission
 "Leathem Smith Lodge" vs Wisconsin Highway Commission
 "Odebolt Golf Club" vs Iowa Highway Commission
 La Verne Olson vs Wisconsin Highway Commission ("Lake Breeze Golf Club")
 "Waunakee Golf Club" vs Northwestern Railroad

References

External links

WorldGolf.com, partial list of golf courses for Homer Fieldhouse.
Lodi Golf Course (Lodi, WI) documentation posted on Flickr.
Two photos of the Wisconsin Pavilion at the New York 1964-1965 World's Fair.
Wisconsin Golfer Magazine- State Amateur qualifying sites (see District 5: The GC at Camelot, Lomira)
Madison.com obituaries, 07/06/2008

1928 births
2008 deaths
People from Dodgeville, Wisconsin
Artists from Madison, Wisconsin
United States Marines
American landscape architects
Golf course architects
Architects from Wisconsin